Stuart Robertson (born 29 September 1959) is a Scottish former professional footballer who played as a midfielder. During his 21-season career, he played for a number of teams in the English Football League and the Scottish Football League.

References

External links

1959 births
Living people
Footballers from Glasgow
Scottish footballers
Association football midfielders
Burnley F.C. players
Exeter City F.C. players
Doncaster Rovers F.C. players
Dumbarton F.C. players
Falkirk F.C. players
Brechin City F.C. players
Queen of the South F.C. players
Stirling Albion F.C. players
Ayr United F.C. players
East Stirlingshire F.C. players
Albion Rovers F.C. players
English Football League players
Scottish Football League players
Pollok F.C. players